Sviták (feminine Svitáková) is a Czech surname. Notable people with the surname include:

Adora Svitak (born 1997), American writer
Ivan Sviták (1925–1994), Czech philosopher, critic, and poet
Jakub Sviták, Czech handball player
Jan Sviták (1898–1945), Czech actor and film director
Martin Sviták (born 1980), Czech footballer

Czech-language surnames